Andre Agassi defeated the two-time defending champion Michael Chang in the final, 7–5, 6–2 to win the singles tennis title at the 1995 Cincinnati Masters.

Seeds

  Andre Agassi (champion)
  Pete Sampras (quarterfinals)
  Boris Becker (second round)
  Michael Chang (final)
  Yevgeny Kafelnikov (second round)
  Goran Ivanišević (quarterfinals)
  Wayne Ferreira (third round)
  Michael Stich (semifinals)
  Sergi Bruguera (second round)
  Richard Krajicek (first round)
  Jim Courier (quarterfinals)
  Stefan Edberg (first round)
  Thomas Enqvist (semifinals)
  Andriy Medvedev (second round)
  Todd Martin (third round)
  Alberto Berasategui (third round)

Draw

Finals

Top half

Section 1

Section 2

Bottom half

Section 3

Section 4

External links
 Main draw

Singles